The 1974 United States Senate election in Oklahoma was held November 3, 1974. Incumbent Republican U.S. Senator Henry Bellmon narrowly won re-election to a second term, beating Representative Ed Edmondson (D-OK) by nearly 4,000 votes.

Major candidates

Democratic
Ed Edmondson, U.S. Congressman
Charles R. Nesbitt, Oklahoma Corporation Commissioner 
Wilburn Cartwright, former U.S. Congressman

Republican
Henry Bellmon, incumbent U.S. Senator

Results

See also 
 1974 United States Senate elections

References

1974 Oklahoma elections
Oklahoma
1974